Vishma Rathriya (Surprise Night) is a 2003 Sri Lankan Sinhala adult drama film directed by Srilal Priyadeva and produced by Niroshan Devapriya for Nethra Anjana Films. It stars Arjuna Kamalanath and Nilushi Halpita in lead roles along with Teddy Vidyalankara and Eardley Wedamuni. Music composed by Sangeeth Bharatha. It is the 1005th Sri Lankan film in the Sinhala cinema.

Cast
 Arjuna Kamalanath
 Teddy Vidyalankara
 Eardley Wedamuni
 Nilushi Halpita
 Sunil Bamunuarachchi
 Thanuja Niroshini
 Kumara Ranepura
 Chathura Perera

References

2003 films
2000s Sinhala-language films
2003 drama films
Sri Lankan drama films